Marc Stiegler (born 1 August 1954) is an American science fiction author and software developer. He co-authored Valentina: Soul in Sapphire (1984) with Joseph H. Delaney. The computer program, Valentina, was one of science fiction's earliest examples of sentient computer software, completely unlike mainframe AIs such as HAL and Colossus.

Stiegler also wrote the short story "The Gentle Seduction", based on Vernor Vinge's ideas about a technological "singularity,"  the exponential growth of future technology that will drastically affect the human condition. The story's characters are augmented with molecular nanotechnology. The 'seducer' is the technology itself, and perhaps the programmers of the technology - the majority of mankind is more willing to swallow a pill that fixes one's back (this happens in the story) than take a pill that installs a computer in one's forehead (also from the story). He also realized that many humans do not have the mental fortitude to survive the Technological singularity. The heroine of "The Gentle Seduction" is a normal woman whose very elemental connection with her own identity is key in soothing humanity's jarring experience of finally meeting an alien mind.

His novel Earthweb takes place in a future where computers have been secured from attack, the Web has evolved to largely supplant government as the underpinning fabric of human civilization, and idea futures are used to make decisions about important future events.

Stiegler's software development career partly parallels his science fiction. His non-fiction work, "Hypermedia and the Singularity" predates the development of the Web and predicts that hypertext will play a key role in accelerating the evolution of knowledge. Shortly after writing this article, he took over management, of Project Xanadu, the hypertext system envisioned by Ted Nelson. Later software development efforts included the development of DecideRight (1995) which won the Software Publishing Association's CODIE Award  for Best Numeric or Data Software Program. In the late 1990s his attention turned to computer security. Later he developed CapDesk, a capability-based desktop resistant to cyberattack, and invented the principles underlying Polaris, an overlay for the Windows operating system that secures the system against several important kinds of computer viruses and trojan horses. He gave talks on object capability security at the RSA Conference in 2012 and 2013.  While at HP Labs, his research included approaches to security in planetary scale computing.

Bibliography

Books
 Valentina: Soul in Sapphire (1984) (with Joseph H. Delaney) 
 Programming Languages: Featuring the IBM PC and Compatibles (1985) (with Bob Hanson)
 David's Sling (1987) 
 Earthweb (1998) 
 The Braintrust Series
 The Braintrust: A Harmony of Enemies (2017) 
 Crescendo of Fire (2018) 
 Rhapsody For the Tempest (2018) 
 Ode To Defiance (2019) 
 Braintrust: Requiem (2020)

Collection
 The Gentle Seduction (1990) 
 "Masters of the Mortal God" (1990)
 "Too Loving a Touch" (1982)
 "Petals of Rose" (1981)
 "The Bully and the Crazy Boy" (1980)		
 "Evolution of Entropic Error in Closed Conservative Systems" (1982) non-fiction article
 "A Simple Case of Suicide" (1983)		
 "The Gentle Seduction" (1989)		
 "Hypermedia and the Singularity" (1989) non-fiction article

Anthologies containing stories by Marc Stiegler
 Nanodreams (1995)

Short works
The following three stories comprise the novel Valentina: Soul in Sapphire:
 "Valentina" (1984) (with Joseph H Delaney) Hugo nominee
 "The Crystal Ball" (1984) (with Joseph H Delaney)		
 "The Light in the Looking Glass" (1984) (with Joseph H Delaney)

Awards
 Hugo Award for Best Novella finalist (1985): "Valentina"
 Prometheus Award Best Novel finalist (1988): David's Sling
 Prometheus Award Best Novel finalist (1999): Earthweb
 Prometheus Award Best Novel finalist (2018): The Braintrust
 Prometheus Award Best Novel finalist (2019): Crescendo of Fire and Rhapsody for the Tempest,
 Prometheus Award Best Novel finalist (2020): Ode to Defiance
 Prometheus Award Best Novel finalist (2021): Braintrust: Requiem

References

External links
 Marc Stiegler's website, with a selection of his fiction and non-fiction writings.
 Marc Stiegler bibliography at the Locus Index to Science Fiction
 

20th-century American novelists
American male novelists
American science fiction writers
Living people
Internet pioneers
1954 births
American male short story writers
20th-century American short story writers
20th-century American male writers